The 2009 AFC Champions League qualifying play-off took place between 18 and 25 February 2009. The winners in the play-off round advanced to the group Stage of the 2009 AFC Champions League, while the losers in each round entered the 2009 AFC Cup group stage.

Preliminary round

|-
!colspan="3"|East Zone

|}

Play-off round

|-
!colspan="3"|East Zone

|-
!colspan="3"|West Zone

|}

References

Qualifying play-off